Terpios fugax is a species of sea sponge belonging to the family Suberitidae. It is found on rocky shores on both sides of the North Atlantic. This species forms small, thin patches on rocks and would be inconspicuous if it weren't for its colour, a startlingly vivid blue.

References
Terpios fugax at World Register of Marine Species
Barrett, J. & Yonge, C. M. (1958) Collins Pocket Guide to the Sea Shore.  Collins, London p43

Suberitidae
Fauna of the Atlantic Ocean
Sponges described in 1864